Voinovich, Voynovich or Vojnović may refer to:

Aljoša Vojnović, Croatian footballer
Dejan Vojnović, Croatian athlete
Đorđe Vojnović, politician from Dalmatia
Emil Vojnović (1851–1927), Austro-Hungarian Army general and historian
George Voinovich, US politician, former Mayor, Governor, and Senator
Goran Vojnović (born 1980), Slovenian writer, poet, screenwriter, film director
Ivo Vojnović, writer from Dubrovnik
Konstantin Vojnović, politician and academic from Croatia
Lujo Vojnović, politician and diplomat from Montenegro
Lyanco Vojnović, Brazilian footballer
Maja Vojnović, Slovenian handball player
Mark Voynovich, Russian admiral
Milan Vojnovic, professor of data science at the London School of Economics
Nataša Vojnović, Bosnian Serb model
Vladimir Voinovich, Russian writer

See also
House of Vojnović, a Serb noble house from Herceg Novi
Vojinovac
Vojnovac
Vujanović
Vujinovača

Croatian surnames
Serbian surnames